A repayment mortgage is a term generally used in the UK to describe a mortgage in which the monthly repayments consist of repaying the capital amount borrowed as well as the accrued interest, so that the amount borrowed decreases throughout the term and by the end of the loan term has been fully repaid. This contrasts with an interest-only mortgage (such as an endowment mortgage or some types of balloon payment mortgage) where monthly repayments are for interest, and the borrower must repay the full loan at term in a lump sum. 

One advantage of a repayment mortgage is that it removes the risk of having an investment (as exists in an endowment mortgage), the performance of which is dependent on the stockmarket. The borrower is also less likely to suffer from negative equity because the mortgage balance will be reducing month on month.

As time moves on, the equity percentage in the property increases.  However, in the early years the bulk of the mortgage repayments consist of the interest component, so not much of the capital is actually paid off for some time.

See also
UK mortgage terminology

References

Mortgage